Walter Keith Thomas (28 July 1929 – 5 October 2021) was an English footballer who played as a right winger. During the 1950s, Thomas made 97 appearances in the Football League for Sheffield Wednesday, Cardiff City, Plymouth Argyle and Exeter City.

Born in Oswestry, Thomas played for the town's local club prior to signing for Sheffield Wednesday in 1950. A schoolteacher by profession, he rejoined Oswestry Town as player-manager in 1957 and, in 1959, joined Welsh side Pwllheli in the same position.

Thomas died on 5 October 2021, at the age of 92.

References

1929 births
2021 deaths
Association football wingers
Cardiff City F.C. players
English Football League players
Exeter City F.C. players
Plymouth Argyle F.C. players
Sheffield Wednesday F.C. players
Sportspeople from Oswestry
English footballers
Oswestry Town F.C. players
Pwllheli F.C. players
Oswestry Town F.C. managers
Pwllheli F.C. managers